Marcel Meijer from the Social Democrats had been mayor since 2014. 
On election night, the parties from the traditional red bloc won a majority. However, the Social Democrats dramatically ended up supporting Søren Wiese from Venstre, citing that "the Green Left will not support us, so we must take the next best thing".

However Ulla Holm from the Green Left later announced that they would support Marcel Meijer as mayor, and in the end Marcel Meijer would break the deal with Venstre and continue as mayor for a third term.

Electoral system
For elections to Danish municipalities, a number varying from 9 to 31 are chosen to be elected to the municipal council. The seats are then allocated using the D'Hondt method and a closed list proportional representation.
Samsø Municipality had 11 seats in 2021

Unlike in Danish General Elections, in elections to municipal councils, electoral alliances are allowed.

Electoral alliances  

Electoral Alliance 1

Electoral Alliance 2

Results

Notes

References 

Samsø